A list of films produced in Argentina in 1930:

1930
Films
Argentine